The Grey Devil is a 1926 American silent Western film directed by Bennett Cohen and starring Jack Perrin, Lorraine Eason and Tom London.

Cast
 Jack Perrin
 Lorraine Eason
 Tom London
 Andrew Waldron
 Jerome La Grasse
 Milburn Morante

References

External links
 

1926 films
1926 Western (genre) films
Films directed by Bennett Cohen
Rayart Pictures films
American black-and-white films
Silent American Western (genre) films
1920s English-language films
1920s American films